The 2010 NWT/Yukon Scotties Tournament of Hearts was held January 7–10 at the Yellowknife Curling Club in Yellowknife, Northwest Territories. The winning team represented NWT/Yukon at the 2010 Scotties Tournament of Hearts in Sault Ste. Marie, Ontario.

Teams

Standings

Scores
Galusha 7-6 Cormier
Grant 6-5 Cormier
Galusha 11-8 Grant
Cormier 5-9 Galusha
Cormier 8-5 Grant
Grant 10-6 Galusha
Cormier 14-8 Galusha
Cormier 6-5 Grant
Grant 6-5 Galusha

Tie breakers
Cormier 10-4 Galusha
Cormier 8-5 Grant

References

Yukon NWT
Curling in the Northwest Territories
Scotties Tournament of Hearts
NWT/Yukon Scotties Tournament of Hearts